Neil Simon was an American playwright, screenwriter and author. He had received four Tony Awards and a Golden Globe Award.

Major associations

Academy Awards

Emmy Awards

Tony Awards

Golden Globe Awards

Writers Guild of America Awards

Other honors and awards
 1967 Evening Standard Theatre Awards – Sweet Charity
 1968 Sam S. Shubert Award
 1972 Cue Entertainer of the Year Award
 1981 Doctor of Humane Letters from Hofstra University
 1983 American Theater Hall of Fame
 1983 New York Drama Critics' Circle Award – Brighton Beach Memoirs
 1983 Outer Critics Circle Award – Brighton Beach Memoirs
 1986 New York State Governor's Award
 1989 American Comedy Awards – Lifetime Achievement
 1991 Drama Desk Award for Outstanding New Play – Lost in Yonkers
 1991 Pulitzer Prize for Drama – Lost in Yonkers
 1995 Kennedy Center Honoree
 2006 Mark Twain Prize for American Humor

References

External links 

 
 
 
 
 video: , 6 minutes
 The Neil Simon Festival
 PBS article, American Masters

Simon, Neil
Works by Neil Simon
Simon, Neil